The IZOD IndyCar World Championship Presented by Honda was an IndyCar Series race on the  Las Vegas Motor Speedway, held from 1996 to 2000, and again in 2011. It was first known as the Las Vegas 500k. The Champ Car World Series held a race at the track during the 2004 and 2005 seasons as doubleheaders with the NASCAR Camping World Truck Series and a street race was held in Las Vegas at the Fremont Street Experience in 2007.

Race history

AAA Championship Car
The Silver State Century was a 100-lap/100-mile race at Las Vegas Park, a dirt track in Las Vegas. Jimmy Bryan was the winner of the race's lone running.

Stardust Raceway

The USAC Championship Car series held a race on the short-lived Stardust International Raceway in 1968.  Bobby Unser won the Stardust 150 ahead of Mario Andretti and Joe Leonard.

Caesars Palace

Starting in 1981, Formula One scheduled a race on laid out in the parking lot of the Caesars Palace hotel. Following mediocre crowds, Formula One left after only two years. In 1983, CART picked up where Formula One left off, and started holding a race on the same course (albeit the layout was modified). After two editions under CART sanctioning, the race ended.

Indy Racing League
In 1996, Las Vegas Motor Speedway was announced as a venue for the newly formed Indy Racing League. The facility was still under construction when it was added to the 1996-97 season.

For the first four runnings, the race was advertised as a 500 km race. Starting in 1997, the race was moved to a night race. In 2000, it was moved from the fall to the spring, and returned to a day race. After 2000, the race was removed from the IndyCar Series for a decade.

Champ Car
In 2004–2005, the Champ Car series held a  race at Las Vegas Motor Speedway. Both editions were held under the lights on a Saturday night as part of the NASCAR Craftsman Truck Series weekend in the fall. After only two years, however, the race was considered unpopular and was removed from the schedule.

For 2005, the name of the race was changed to the Hurricane Relief 400, and it served as a fundraiser for Hurricane Katrina recovery.

Fremont Street

Champ Car held their first event on Easter Sunday, April 8, 2007. The race was titled the Vegas Grand Prix. The course was generally liked by competitors and fans. With the dissolution of the Champ Car World Series in 2008, the event was cancelled after only one running.

Lap Records

IZOD IndyCar World Championships

On February 22, 2011, IndyCar CEO Randy Bernard announced the IZOD IndyCar World Championships to be held at Las Vegas Motor Speedway, reviving the 200-lap, 300-mile race format on the new variable banking.  The race was adopted as a tripleheader, with the NASCAR Camping World Truck Series Smith's 350 on Saturday and for the first time, a 100.5-mile Firestone Indy Lights race on Sunday morning.

The first INDYCAR race since 2000 started with a hard-charging Indy Lights race where Sam Schmidt Motorsports teammates Josef Newgarden, Esteban Guerrieri, and Victor Carbone battled each other on the final lap, but Carbone cut the new Indy Lights champion Newgarden's tire on the Nellis Straightaway, leading Guerrieri and Carbone to fight for the win in a side-by-side finish, with Carbone winning by .0229 seconds.

The 200-lap IndyCar feature ended on lap 12 after a 15-car crash that claimed the life of fellow Sam Schmidt Motorsports driver Dan Wheldon.  IndyCar decided that the race would not continue, and spectators were offered refunds of all Sunday tickets that were used, and partial refunds of multiple-day tickets (Qualifying and NASCAR tickets could not be refunded, as Friday qualifying and Saturday NASCAR events finished without incident, so only the portion relating with the Sunday race could be processed).

As a result of the incident, on December 8, 2011, Bernard announced that the IndyCar World Championships would not return to Las Vegas in 2012.  The Smith's 350, which had been set for the IndyCar weekend, was moved up two weeks.

Past winners

Las Vegas Park (dirt oval)

Fremont Street circuit

Las Vegas Motor Speedway

Firestone Indy Lights
In 2011, the Firestone Indy Lights support race was added to the World Championships.

References

External links

IndyCar.com race page

Champ Car races
Motorsport in Las Vegas
Former IndyCar Series races
Las Vegas Motor Speedway